2 is the second studio album from the American musical group Retribution Gospel Choir, led by Alan Sparhawk of the band Low. It was released on January 26, 2010, in the US and February 8, 2010, in the UK on the Sub Pop Records label.

Track listing
All songs written by Alan Sparhawk.

Personnel
 Alan Sparhawk – vocals, guitar
 Eric Pollard – drums, vocals
 Steve Garrington – bass

References

2010 albums
Retribution Gospel Choir albums
Sub Pop albums